Cincinnati Nature Center is a nature center and preserve with two locations, the main site known as Rowe Woods in Milford, Ohio, and Long Branch Farm in Goshen, Ohio.

Rowe Woods
The 1,025-acre Rowe Woods in Milford features the Rowe Visitor Center with nature exhibits, a wildlife viewing window, library and gift shop. There are over 16 miles of trails that pass through eastern deciduous forest, former agricultural fields, streams, and pond habitats.

The Schott Nature PlayScape was designed to encourage open-ended creative play through the use of natural features on the 1.6-acre site, including water, logs, rocks and dirt. The creation of the PlayScape was inspired by Richard Louv's book Last Child in the Woods that concludes that direct exposure to nature is essential for healthy childhood development.

The 1918 Groesbeck Lodge is planned to be home to the new Center for Conservation & Stewardship, which will become a regional center for excellence in land conservation.

Long Branch Farm
The 642-acre Long Branch Farm and Trails in Goshen is open to members only. There are four miles of trails through deciduous forest, fields, streams and ponds.

See also
 Gorman Heritage Farm, formerly operated by the Cincinnati Nature Center

References

External links
 

Nature centers in Ohio
Buildings and structures in Clermont County, Ohio
Tourist attractions in Clermont County, Ohio
Protected areas of Clermont County, Ohio
Education in Clermont County, Ohio
Protected areas established in 1965
1965 establishments in Ohio